Valentin Genchev (Bulgarian: Валентин Генчев; born ) is a Bulgarian weightlifter.

Career

European Championships

In 2021 he competed at the 2021 European Weightlifting Championships in the 67 kg category, winning the silver in the clean & jerk portion and the bronze medal in the total.
In 2022 he competed at the 2022 European Weightlifting Championships in the 67 kg category,winning the silver in the snatch portion and the gold medal in the clean and jerk and the total.

Major results

References

Living people
2000 births
Bulgarian male weightlifters
European Weightlifting Championships medalists
21st-century Bulgarian people